Sam Watson or Samuel Watson may refer to:

Sam Watson (equestrian) (born 1985), Irish equestrian
Sam Watson (politician), US politician
Sam Watson (trade unionist) (1898–1967), English coalminers' leader
Samuel Watson (cyclist) (born 2001), English cyclist
Samuel Watson (horologist) (fl. c. 1687–c. 1710), Sheriff of Coventry and manufacturer of the first stopwatch
Samuel Watson (sculptor) (1662–1715), sculptor in wood and stone
Samuel C. Watson (1832–1892), US druggist, doctor, and civic leader 
Samuel E. Watson (died 1847), U.S. Marine Corps officer
Samuel Wagan Watson (born 1972), Aboriginal Australian poet
Samuel William Watson (1952–2019), Aboriginal Australian novelist, filmmaker and political activist
Sam Watson, 1966 Irish winner of Fitchburg Longsjo Classic bicycle race